The Chicago Architecture Center (CAC), formerly the Chicago Architecture Foundation, is a nonprofit cultural organization based in Chicago, Illinois, United States, whose mission is to inspire people to discover why design matters. Founded in 1966, its programs include public tours and programs, most notably the docent-led architecture cruise on the Chicago River, and other tours in the Chicago area. The river cruise is ranked in the top ten tours in the U.S. by TripAdvisor users.  CAC includes conference and exhibition space, including a scale model of downtown Chicago.

History 
The CAC was founded in 1966 as the Chicago School of Architecture Foundation to save H. H. Richardson's Glessner House, one of Chicago's oldest residences.  In 1971, it began to offer lectures and volunteer-led tours of Chicago to the public.  It was renamed the Chicago Architecture Foundation in 1979, and CAF later moved into the Railway Exchange Building on Michigan Avenue in 1992 with an expanded book store and program space.

CAC and the American Architectural Foundation  co-founded the Association of Architecture Organizations in 2005, a now international membership group that develops the programs and work of public architecture education groups. In 2009, the center opened a new exhibition, Chicago Model, which includes a 3D-printed scale model of the central area of the city and is now on permanent display.  Changing its name to the Chicago Architecture Center, it moved to a newly expanded space in Mies van der Rohe's One Illinois Center at 111 E. Wacker Dr. on the Chicago River in August 2018.

Tours
The CAC offers approximately 85 different tours of the city. All tours are led by trained volunteer docents who go through a 14-week training course before being certified to lead CAC tours. Many tours in the Loop include historic buildings such as the Chicago Board of Trade, the Marquette Building, the Monadnock Building, and Daniel Burnham and John Wellborn Root's Rookery among many others. Some modern buildings that are explored include the Sears Tower, John Hancock Center, Mies van der Rohe's Chicago Federal Center and the Trump Tower. The CAC also offers tours of parks and public spaces such as Millennium Park, Maggie Daley Park and the Chicago Pedway. During the summer months, the CAC offers tours of various neighborhoods throughout Chicago in addition to downtown tours. The CAC's most popular tour, the CAFC River Cruise aboard Chicago's First Lady Cruises has departures April–November every year. The CAC offers other tours year-round.

Open House Chicago
The CAC also hosts the largest annual architecture event in the city, Open House Chicago. This free, annual event gives the public access to buildings and spaces around the city that are typically closed to the public. Held over a weekend in October, OHC attracts tens of thousands of participants from across the country and around the world.

Education
The CAC offers a robust architecture and design education program and has received several awards for their curricula and textbooks including Schoolyards to Skylines, the Architecture Handbook, and DiscoverDesign.org. In 2013, the CAC opened the ArcelorMittal Design Studio, a studio space dedicated to introducing design concepts to individuals of all ages.

CAC Store

The CAC Store, which offers Chicago and architecture-themed products, is located on the first floor of the Chicago Architecture Center at 111 E. Wacker Dr.

References

External links
 Chicago Architecture Center web site
 Chicago Architecture Center YouTube Channel
 Chicago Architecture Center Facebook 
 Chicago Architecture Center Twitter

Organizations established in 1966
Architecture organizations based in the United States
Organizations based in Chicago
Museums in Chicago
History museums in Illinois
Industry museums in Illinois
Architecture museums in the United States
1966 establishments in Illinois
Foundations based in the United States